"Your Love Shines Through" is a song written by Wayland Holyfield and Gary Nicholson, and recorded by American country music artist Mickey Gilley.  It was released in August 1983 as the second and final single from his album Fool for Your Love.  The song reached No. 5 on the U.S. Billboard Hot Country Singles chart and No. 6 on the Canadian RPM Country Tracks chart in Canada.

Chart performance

References

1983 singles
1983 songs
Mickey Gilley songs
Songs written by Wayland Holyfield
Song recordings produced by Jim Ed Norman
Songs written by Gary Nicholson
Epic Records singles